Tausani Levale is a Canadian rugby sevens player. She won a gold medal at the 2019 Pan American Games as a member of the Canada women's national rugby sevens team. Levale credits her interest in the sport of rugby union in part to her Samoan heritage and the complexity of the sport. Levale plays in both rugby sevens and the 15s. She made her debut with the Canadian national team at the age of 17 in 2017 and was the youngest woman to do so since Caroline Crossley in 2015.

References

1999 births
Living people
Canada international rugby sevens players
Female rugby sevens players
Rugby sevens players at the 2019 Pan American Games
Pan American Games gold medalists for Canada
Pan American Games medalists in rugby sevens
People from the Alberni-Clayoquot Regional District
Canadian people of Samoan descent
Medalists at the 2019 Pan American Games
Canada international women's rugby sevens players